Podgorye is a rural locality (a village) in Krasavino Urban Settlement, Velikoustyugsky District, Vologda Oblast, Russia. The population was 10 as of 2002.

Geography 
Podgorye is located 29 km northeast of Veliky Ustyug (the district's administrative centre) by road. Korobovskoye is the nearest rural locality.

References 

Rural localities in Velikoustyugsky District